The Syracuse Scorpions were an American soccer club based in Syracuse, New York and member of the American Soccer League.

The club folded after the 1970 season, but was revived and renamed the Syracuse Suns. The club folded again after the 1971 season, but was revived again before the 1973 season. The team folded 5 games into the 1974 season and forfeited the rest of their games. A new Scorpions team was announced for the 2011-12 MISL season. The team later announced that it would be called the Syracuse Silver Knights.

Year-by-year

References

Soccer in Syracuse, New York
Defunct soccer clubs in New York (state)
Men's soccer clubs in New York (state)
American Soccer League (1933–1983) teams
1969 establishments in New York (state)
Association football clubs established in 1969
1974 disestablishments in New York (state)
Association football clubs disestablished in 1974